See also 1695 in piracy, Other events in 1696, 1697 in piracy, and Timeline of piracy.

Events

Europe
 Undated - 24 of Henry Every's pirates are arrested in Ireland and England.  Every eludes capture and is never seen again.
January 26 - William Kidd issued a letter of marque by King William III of England.
May - Kidd sets sail from Plymouth, England en route to New York City aboard the Adventure Galley.

North America
September - Kidd leaves New York on the Adventure Galley.

Births

Deaths

Piracy
Piracy by year
1696 in military history